Halysidota baritioides is a moth of the family Erebidae. Described by Walter Rothschild in 1909, it is found in Brazil.

References

Halysidota
Moths described in 1909